Bektur Talgat Uulu (born 9 September 1994) is a Kyrgyz professional footballer who plays as a midfielder for I-League club NEROCA.

Career
In January 2017, Uulu signed for Churchill Brothers.

Uulu made his professional debut in India, playing for Churchill Brothers in the I-League against East Bengal. He came on as a halftime substitute for Kingsley Fernandes but could not prevent his side from losing 2–0. On 22 April 2017 he scored four goals in a match against Chennai City.

In August 2017, Uulu signed a one-year contract with Sur of the Oman First Division League.

In January 2018 he returned to Churchill Brothers. He played a total of 10 matches in the 2017–18 I-League season. Later he was included in Churchill's squad for remaining matches of Goa Professional League. He scored his first goal of the 2017-18 season in a 10–0 win against FC Bardez.

In October 2018, he joined Aizawl FC.

NEROCA
In August 2022, Uulu returned to India after three years with I-League club NEROCA. On 18 August, he made his debut for the club in the Imphal Derby against TRAU in the Durand Cup, which ended in a 3–1 win.

International career
He was called 2 times for the Kyrgyzstan national football team. But as of January 2019, he hasn't played in any official matches.

Career statistics

Club

References

External links
Bektur Talgat Uulu at The Players Agent

1994 births
Living people
Kyrgyzstani footballers
Kyrgyzstani expatriate footballers
Kyrgyzstan under-21 international footballers
Association football midfielders
FC Abdysh-Ata Kant players
FC Alga Bishkek players
Sur SC players
Churchill Brothers FC Goa players
FC Zhenis Astana players
United Victory players
PSM Makassar players
NEROCA FC players
I-League players
Kyrgyz Premier League players
Dhivehi Premier League players
Liga 1 (Indonesia) players
Kyrgyzstani expatriate sportspeople in Kazakhstan
Kyrgyzstani expatriate sportspeople in Oman
Kyrgyzstani expatriate sportspeople in India
Kyrgyzstani expatriate sportspeople in the Maldives
Kyrgyzstani expatriate sportspeople in Indonesia
Expatriate footballers in Kazakhstan
Expatriate footballers in Oman
Expatriate footballers in India
Expatriate footballers in the Maldives
Expatriate footballers in Indonesia